École Supérieure d'Ingénieurs Privée de Gafsa is a private engineering school in Gafsa, Tunisia. It is located at the Campus universitaire Sidi Ahmed Zarroug, where a number of other postsecondary institutions are located.

References

External links

Universities in Tunisia
Scientific organisations based in Tunisia